The Kanchanjunga Express is an Express train belonging to Eastern Railway zone that runs between  (Kolkata) and  in India. It is currently operated with 13173/13174 train numbers on a four-days-a-week basis.

Service

The 13173/Kanchanjunga Express has an average speed of 45 km/hr and covers 1546 km in 35h 20m. The 13174/Kanchanjunga Express has an average speed of 46 km/hr and covers 1546 km in 35h 20m.

Timings

 13173/Kanchanjunga Express departs Sealdah every Tuesday,Thursday,Friday and Sunday at 06:35 hrs and reaches Agartala at 17:55 hrs the next day.
 13174/Kanchanjunga Express departs Agartala every Tuesday,Thursday,Saturday and Sunday at 08:05 hrs and reaches Sealdah at 19:25 hrs the next day.

Route and halts 

The important halts of the train are:

WEST BENGAL
 Sealdah (Kolkata)
 
 
 
 
 
 
 
 
 
 
 
 
 New Jalpaiguri (Siliguri)
 
 
 Falakata
 
 
 Kamakhyaguri

JHARKHAND
 

BIHAR
 
 

ASSAM
 Gossaigaon Hat
 
 
 
 
 
 
 
 
 
 
 
 New Karimganj

TRIPURA

Coach composition

The train has standard ICF rakes with a max speed of 110 kmph. The train consists of 19 coaches:

 1 AC II Tier
 5 AC III Tier
 8 Sleeper coaches
 4 General Unreserved
 2 Seating cum Luggage Rake

Traction
Sealdah Agartala Kanchanjunga Express is hauled by WAP-7 or WAP-4 Locomotive of Electric Loco Shed, Howrah- from  till . Than the train is hauled by Diesel Loco Shed, Siliguri-based WDP-4B Locomotive from  till .

Rake sharing

The train shares its rake with 13175/13176 Sealdah–Silchar Kanchenjunga Express.

Direction reversal

The train reverses its direction 2 times:

See also 

 Agartala railway station
 Sealdah railway station
 Sealdah–Silchar Kanchenjunga Express
 Kanchenjunga Express

Other trains on the Kolkata–New Jalpaiguri sector
 12041/42 New Jalpaiguri–Howrah Shatabdi Express
 22309/10 Howrah–New Jalpaiguri AC Express
 12377/78 Padatik Express
 12343/44 Darjeeling Mail
 15959/60 Kamrup Express
 13175/76 Kanchanjungha Express/Sealdah–Silchar Kanchanjunga Express
 12345/46 Saraighat Express
 15721/22 New Jalpaiguri–Digha Express
 12517/18 Kolkata–Guwahati Garib Rath Express
 12525/26 Dibrugarh–Kolkata Superfast Express
 13141/42 Teesta Torsha Express
 13147/48 Uttar Banga Express
 12503/04 Bangalore Cantonment–Agartala Humsafar Express
 13181/82 Kolkata–Silghat Town Kaziranga Express 
 22511/12 Lokmanya Tilak Terminus–Kamakhya Karmabhoomi Express
 15643/44 Puri–Kamakhya Weekly Express (via Howrah)
 12363/64 Kolkata–Haldibari Intercity Express
 12509/10 Guwahati–Bengaluru Cantt. Superfast Express
 12507/08 Thiruvananthapuram–Silchar Superfast Express
 12513/14 Guwahati–Secunderabad Express

Notes

References

External links 

 15659/Kanchanjunga Express India Rail Info
 15660/Kanchanjunga Express India Rail Info

Transport in Kolkata
Transport in Agartala
Express trains in India
Rail transport in West Bengal
Rail transport in Jharkhand
Rail transport in Bihar
Rail transport in Assam
Rail transport in Tripura
Railway services introduced in 2016
Named passenger trains of India